"Back on My Feet Again" is the second single released by the Foundations. It was the follow-up to their hit single "Baby, Now That I've Found You". It was written by Tony Macaulay and John MacLeod and produced by Tony Macaulay. It charted at number 18 in the UK and also in Ireland.  It reached No. 59 in the U.S. and number 29 in Canada.

Clem Curtis was the lead vocalist on this song. A re-recorded version featuring Clem Curtis's replacement, Colin Young, appeared on the Marble Arch album. The B-side of the single, "I Can Take or Leave Your Loving", was written by Rick Jones

Releases
 The Foundations - "Back on My Feet Again" / "I Can Take or Leave Your Loving" - PYE 7N 17417 - 1968
 The Foundations - "Back on My Feet Again" / "I Can Take or Leave Your Loving" - UNI 55058

Charts

References

1968 singles
The Foundations songs
Songs written by Tony Macaulay
Pye Records singles
Uni Records singles
Songs written by John Macleod (songwriter)
1968 songs